Ľudovít Komadel (1 November 1927 – 1 September 2022) was a Slovak swimmer. He competed in the men's 200 metre breaststroke at the 1952 Summer Olympics. At the 1968 Summer Olympics, he served as a physician for the Czechoslovak Olympic team.

References

External links
 

1927 births
2022 deaths
Slovak male swimmers
Olympic swimmers of Czechoslovakia
Swimmers at the 1952 Summer Olympics
Olympic team doctors
Sportspeople from Piešťany
Recipients of the Olympic Order